Lucius Caecilius Metellus (221 BC) was the son of Lucius Caecilius Metellus Denter. He was Consul in 251 BC and 247 BC, Pontifex Maximus beginning about 243 BC and Dictator in 224 BC.

He defeated the Carthaginian general Hasdrubal at the celebrated Battle of Panormus, a turning point of the First Punic War which led to Roman domination of Sicily. In that battle, after which he received the Honours of the Triumph, he defeated thirteen enemy generals and captured one hundred and twenty elephants, some of which he exhibited to the Roman people.

In this battle, so decisive for Rome, the Carthaginian advantage was subdued by luring the enemy to terrain where staked ditches had been dug.  This, coupled with the element of surprise and a quick counter-attack, allowed the Roman infantry to rout the attacking Carthaginians.

While Metellus was Pontifex Maximus, a fire destroyed the Temple of Vesta and threatened to destroy the Palladium and other sacred objects. Lucius Caecilius Metellus, without hesitating, threw himself amidst the flames and reappeared with the tutelary symbol of the first Rome. However, his eyes were badly injured by the intense heat and he went blind, for which the Senate granted him the privilege of going by chariot to the Curia. In memory of that noble achievement of their ancestor, the Caecilii started to mint the image of Pallas on their consular coins.

He was the father of Lucius Caecilius Metellus, Quintus Caecilius Metellus and Marcus Caecilius Metellus.

See also
Caecilia gens

References

290s BC births
Year of birth uncertain
221 BC deaths
3rd-century BC Roman consuls
3rd-century BC clergy
Caecilii Metelli
Ancient Roman dictators
Pontifices maximi of the Roman Republic
Blind clergy
Blind politicians